Algoma Mills Water Aerodrome  is located on Lauzon Bay, Ontario, Canada and serves the community of Algoma Mills.

See also
Elliot Lake Municipal Airport

References

Registered aerodromes in Algoma District
Seaplane bases in Ontario